Dragon Creek is a creek located in the Cariboo region of British Columbia.  The creek was discovered in the 1860s by a Frenchman nicknamed The Dragon because of his fighting abilities. The creek has been mined using drifting, sluicing, hydraulicking and drilling.

References

Rivers of British Columbia
Cariboo Land District